The 1879 Manitoba general election and was held on December 16, 1879.

References 

1879
1879 elections in Canada
1879 in Manitoba
December 1879 events